Doubleday may refer to:

 Doubleday (surname), including a list of people with the name

Publishing imprints 
 Doubleday (publisher), imprint of Knopf Doubleday, a subsidiary of Penguin Random House
 Doubleday Canada, imprint of Penguin Random House Canada
 Image, formerly Doubleday Religion, imprint of Crown Publishing Group, a subsidiary of Penguin Random House

Baseball
 Doubleday Field, Cooperstown, New York, USA; baseball stadium
 Doubleday Field, United States Military Academy, West Point, New York State, USA; a region of the academy; see Johnson Stadium at Doubleday Field
 Auburn Doubledays, single-A baseball team, from  Auburn, New York State, USA

Other uses
 SS Abner Doubleday, Liberty ship built during World War II
 Henry Doubleday Research Association, UK organic growing charity

See also 

 
 
 Doubleday myth about the creation of baseball by Abner Doubleday